S & W Cafeteria is a historic S & W Cafeteria building located in the Downtown Asheville Historic District of Asheville, Buncombe County, North Carolina, USA. It was designed by the architect Douglas Ellington and built in 1929. It is a three-story, brick building in the Art Deco style. The front facade is sheathed in grey ashlar and features polychrome ornamentation and exotic stylistic motifs. In 1974, the S & W Cafeteria moved to the Asheville Mall.

It was listed on the National Register of Historic Places in 1977. 

In 2019, renovations began for the historic building to house S&W Market, a food hall and event venue. S&W Market opened in June 2021.

References

External links

Commercial buildings on the National Register of Historic Places in North Carolina
Art Deco architecture in North Carolina
Commercial buildings completed in 1929
Buildings and structures in Asheville, North Carolina
National Register of Historic Places in Buncombe County, North Carolina
Historic district contributing properties in North Carolina